A trade magazine, also called a trade journal or trade paper (colloquially or disparagingly a trade rag), is a magazine or newspaper whose target audience is people who work in a particular trade or industry. The collective term for this area of publishing is the trade press.

Overview 
Trade publications keep industry members abreast of new developments. In this role, it functions similarly to how academic journals or scientific journals serve their audiences. Trade publications include targeted advertising, which earns a profit for the publication and sales for the advertisers while also providing sales engineering–type advice to the readers, that may inform purchasing and investment decisions.  

Trade magazines typically contain advertising content centered on the industry in question with little, if any, general-audience advertising. They may also contain industry-specific job notices.

For printed publications, some trade magazines operate on a subscription business model known as controlled circulation, in which the subscription is free but is restricted only to subscribers determined to be qualified leads.

See also 
List of trade magazines
Professional magazine

References 
"Trade or Industry Magazines" in Professional/Trade Journals. Piedmont College.

Magazine genres